Changshouhu Town is an urban town in Changshou District, Chongqing, People's Republic of China.

Administrative division
The town is divided into 13 villages and 1 community, the following areas: Shizitan Community, Xiangtang Village, Donghai Village, Huilong Village, Hongguang Village, Huashan Village, Shiling Village, Dashi Village, Shihui Village, Longgou Village, Zizhu Village, Lianggui Village, Anshun Village, and Yuhua Village (狮子滩社区、响塘村、东海村、回龙村、红光村、花山村、石岭村、大石村、石回村、龙沟村、紫竹村、两桂村、安顺村、玉华村).

References

External links

Divisions of Changshou District
Towns in Chongqing